Francis John Childs Ganzoni, 1st Baron Belstead,  (19 January 1882 – 15 August 1958) was a Conservative Party politician in England.

Personal life

Born to Julius Charles Ganzoni and Mary Frances Childs, Ganzoni was educated  at Tonbridge School and Christ Church, Oxford, from which he received a Master of Arts in 1906. In that same year he became a barrister with membership of the Inner Temple. 

On 31 May 1930, he married Gwendolen Gertrude Turner. He was the father of John Ganzoni, 2nd Baron Belstead.

Public service

Ganzoni served in the First World War with the 4th Battalion of the Suffolk Regiment; he rose to the rank of Captain. On 23 May 1914 he won a by-election to become the Conservative Member of Parliament (MP) for the formerly Liberal constituency of Ipswich, a position he would hold, with the exception of a brief period from 1923 to 1924, until 1938. 

During his parliamentary career he held other positions. He served as Chairman of the Private Bills Committee from 1923 to 1938. In 1924 he became Parliamentary Private Secretary to the Postmaster-General, retaining that position until 1929. He held the office of Deputy Lieutenant (DL) of Suffolk.

Honours and arms

Honours
Ganzoni was knighted in the 1921 New Year Honours. On 1 March 1929, his baronetcy was announced  and he was created a Baronet, of Ipswich, in the County of Suffolk for "political and public services" on 30 March 1929. In the 1938 New Year Honours, his barony for "political and public services" was announced and he was raised to the peerage as Baron Belstead, of Ipswich, Suffolk, on 28 January 1938. He was invested as a Fellow of the Royal Geographical Society (FRGS).

Coat of arms

References

External links 
 

1882 births
1958 deaths
English people of Italian descent
Alumni of Christ Church, Oxford
Barons Belstead
English knights
Suffolk Regiment officers
British Army personnel of World War I
Ganzoni
Deputy Lieutenants of Suffolk
Fellows of the Royal Geographical Society
British politicians of Italian descent
Ganzoni
Ganzoni
Ganzoni
Ganzoni
Ganzoni
Ganzoni
Ganzoni
Ganzoni
UK MPs who were granted peerages
English barristers
Members of the Inner Temple
People educated at Tonbridge School
Knights Bachelor
Barons created by George VI